Lady Justice Hannah Magondi Okwengu is a judge of the Court of Appeal in Nairobi.

Education and early career

Okwengu was born in Honge Beach (Yimbo West, near Kisumu). She graduated law school at University of Nairobi in 1979.

She began work as a Land Registrar in Mombasa and for three years she was an advocate with the Municipal Council of Mombasa.

After less than a year at a law firm she joined the Judiciary as an acting Resident Magistrate in October, 1983. Justice Okwengu was a Chief Magistrate by 1999. She then became the Assistant Director of the Kenya Anti-Corruption Authority when she was appointed by President Daniel Moi for a five year term. She served in Mombasa, Nakuru and Nairobi as Chief Magistrate and Judge in Charge of Mombasa Law Court.

She became the President for four years of the International Association of Women Judges Kenya Chapter. She represents East and Southern Africa at the IAWJ. In 2017 at an IAWJ meeting she called for special courts to tackle rape and other sexual and gender based violence.

Personal life
Married, with two sons, two daughters and five grandchildren.

See also

  African Women Law Legacy Project, Justice Hannah Okwengu. Part 1
  African Women Law Legacy Project, Justice Hannah Okwengu. Part 2

References

Living people
Year of birth missing (living people)
20th-century Kenyan judges
21st-century Kenyan judges
Kenyan women judges
20th-century women judges
21st-century women judges